Megacephala foucarti is a species of tiger beetle that was described by Naviaux and Richoux in 2006. It is endemic to Brazil.

References

Cicindelidae
Beetles described in 2006
Endemic fauna of Brazil
Beetles of South America